Thomas M Collinge (born 1910) was an English professional golfer. He lost the 1936 Penfold Scottish Open in a playoff against Jimmy Adams and played for England against Scotland in 1937.

Golf career
Collinge was professional at Swinton Park, Manchester from 1931 before moving to Olton, Solihull in 1946.

The 1936 Penfold Scottish Open was played at Ayr Belleisle Golf Club. Total prize money was £750. After 72 holes Jimmy Adams and Collinge were tied on 287. In the 36-hole play-off, Adams had rounds of 68 and 69 to win by 11 strokes.

Results in major championships

Note: Collinge only played in The Open Championship.

NT = No tournament
CUT = missed the half-way cut
"T" indicates a tie for a place

Team appearances
England–Scotland Professional Match (representing England): 1937 (winners)
Great Britain–Argentina Professional Match (representing Great Britain): 1939 (winners)

References

English male golfers
People from Worsley
1910 births
Year of death missing